Ga-Ramalapa is a large village in Ga-Matlala in the Polokwane Local Municipality of the Capricorn District Municipality of the Limpopo province of South Africa. It is located 47 km northwest of Polokwane.

Education 
 Ramalapa Primary School.

References 

Populated places in the Polokwane Local Municipality